Meat Puppet is a video game developed by Kronos and published by Playmates Interactive for Windows.

Gameplay
Meat Puppet is a PC action game which is part platformer, part puzzle solving, and part shooter.

Reception
Next Generation reviewed the game, rating it three stars out of five, and stated that "Meat Puppet is the sort of game that keeps you playing just to see what happens next, so it's probably best not to give away anything else. With better control, it would have rated a star higher, no question. As it is, the gameplay is just solid enough to let you keep coming back."

Siew-Ching Goh for Australian newspaper The Age said "why set your heart on a showdown when the more likely outcome is being late for the appointment? You'll still have a lot of fun, anyway, running around with Lotos."

Reviews
Game.EXE #8 (Aug 1997)
Computer Gaming World #159 (Oct 1997)
GameStar - Sep, 1997
PC Player (Germany) - Aug, 1997
PC Games - Aug, 1997
GameSpot - Jul 28, 1997
Computer Games Magazine - 1997

References

1997 video games
Action video games
Cyberpunk video games
Single-player video games
Video games developed in the United States
Video games with isometric graphics
Windows games
Windows-only games